George Henry Sanders (3 July 1906 – 25 April 1972) was a British actor and singer whose career spanned over 40 years. His heavy, upper-class English accent and smooth, bass voice often led him to be cast as sophisticated but villainous characters. He is remembered for his roles as Jack Favell in Rebecca (1940), Scott ffolliott in Foreign Correspondent (1940, a rare heroic part), The Saran of Gaza in Samson and Delilah (1949), the most popular film of the year, Addison DeWitt in All About Eve (1950, for which he won an Oscar), Sir Brian De Bois-Guilbert in Ivanhoe (1952), King Richard the Lionheart in King Richard and the Crusaders (1954), Mr. Freeze in a two-part episode of Batman (1966), and the voice of Shere Khan in Disney's The Jungle Book (1967). Fans of detective stories know Sanders as Simon Templar, The Saint, (1939–41), and the suave crimefighter The Falcon (1941–42).

Early life
Sanders was born on 3 July 1906 in Saint Petersburg, Russian Empire, at number 6 Petrovski Ostrov, to rope manufacturer Henry Sanders and horticulturist Margaret ( Kolbe), who was also born in Saint Petersburg, of mostly German, but also Estonian and Scottish ancestry (Sanders wrote of his mother's descent from "the Thomas Clayhills of Dundee, who went to Estonia in 1626 to establish a business there"). Sanders referred to his parents as "well-off" and noted his mother's "forebears of solid social position and impeccable respectability", stating that "to the best of (his) knowledge, (his) father came in the mail". 

A biography published in 1990 alleged that family members' "recent disclosures... indicate" that Sanders' father was the out-of-wedlock son of a Russian noblewoman of the Tsar’s court, and a prince of the House of Oldenburg who was married to a sister of the Tsar. At the time of Henry Sanders's birth, the Anglo-Russian Sanders family were living at Saint Petersburg; the mother, Dagmar, was a lady-in-waiting to the Dowager Empress, and it was said to be through this connection Henry came to be adopted by the Sanders family.

In 1917, at the outbreak of the Russian Revolution, Sanders and his family moved to Great Britain. Like his brother, he attended Bedales School and Brighton College, a boys' independent school in Brighton, then went on to Manchester Technical College, after which he worked in textile research.

Sanders travelled to South America, where he managed a tobacco plantation. The Depression sent him back to Britain.  He worked at an advertising agency, where the company secretary, aspiring actress Greer Garson, suggested that he take up a career in acting.

Career

Early British work
Sanders learned how to sing and got a role on stage in Ballyhoo, which only had a short run, but helped establish him as an actor.

He began to work regularly on the British stage, appearing several times with Edna Best. He co-starred with Dennis King in The Command Performance.

Sanders travelled to New York to appear on Broadway in a production of Noël Coward's Conversation Piece (1934), directed by Coward, which only ran for 55 performances.

Hollywood and 20th Century Fox
Some of these British films were distributed by 20th Century Fox, which was looking for an actor to play a villain in its Hollywood-shot film Lloyd's of London (1936). Sanders was duly cast as Lord Everett Stacy, opposite Tyrone Power, in one of his first leads, as the hero; Sanders' smooth, upper-class English accent, his sleek manner, and his suave, superior, and somewhat threatening air made him in demand for American films for years to come. Lloyd's of London was a big hit, and in November 1936, Fox placed Sanders under a seven-year contract.

Character roles
Sanders returned to Hollywood, where RKO wanted him to play the hero in a series of B-movies, The Saint. The Saint in New York (1938) had already been made starring Louis Hayward in the title role, but when he decided not to return to the role, Sanders took over for The Saint Strikes Back (1939).In 1940, Sanders played Jack Favell in Alfred Hitchcock's 'Rebecca', opposite Laurence Olivier and Joan Fontaine.

A-picture leading man
Sanders was borrowed by United Artists to play the lead in an A film, The Moon and Sixpence (1942), based on the novel by W. Somerset Maugham.

RKO had canceled its Saint series and replaced it with The Falcon in 1941. George Sanders was assigned the leading role of Gay Laurence, debonair man about town always involved in murder cases. Saint author Leslie Charteris thought the resemblance between the Falcon and the Saint was obvious, and sued the studio for unfair competition. Sanders himself was also unhappy about playing still another screen sleuth in still more "B" pictures, and bowed out of the series in 1942 after only four films. (He was replaced by his elder brother, Tom Conway.)

In July 1942, Fox suspended Sanders for refusing the lead in The Undying Monster (1942). "I like to be seen in pictures that at least seem to be slightly worthwhile." In September, they suspended him again for refusing an "unsympathetic role" in The Immortal Sergeant (he was replaced by Morton Lowry). In November, Fox and Sanders came to terms, with the studio offering him a raise in pay and the lead in a film, School for Saboteurs, which became They Came to Blow Up America.

RKO called him back for This Land Is Mine (1943). They bought an original story for him, Nine Lives, but it does not appear to have been made. He was lent to Columbia for Appointment in Berlin (1943).

In February 1943, Fox announced it was developing three film projects for Sanders – The Porcelain Lady, a murder mystery, plus biopics of the Earl of Suffolk and Bethune. Fox originally announced him to play the role of the detective in Laura (1944) alongside Laird Cregar, but neither ended up being in the final film. In 1947, George Sanders portrayed King Charles II in Fox's lavish production of the scandalous historical bodice-ripper, Forever Amber.

Sanders signed a new three-film contract with RKO, starting with Action in Arabia (1944). The film superficially looked expensive but it was actually a low-budget feature, embellished by spectacular location footage filmed in 1933 for an unfinished production about Lawrence of Arabia.

All About Eve and beyond

For his role as the acerbic, cold-blooded theatre critic Addison DeWitt in All About Eve (1950), Sanders won an Academy Award for Best Supporting Actor.

He was a leading man in Black Jack (1950), but was back to supporting/villain roles in I Can Get It for You Wholesale (1951). He signed a three-picture deal with MGM,  for which he did The Light Touch (1951) and Ivanhoe (1952), playing Sir Brian de Bois-Guilbert and dying in a duel with Robert Taylor after professing his love for Jewish maiden Rebecca, played by Elizabeth Taylor. It was a huge success.

Sanders went to Italy to appear opposite Ingrid Bergman in Journey to Italy (1954). Back in Hollywood, he made several movies for MGM: Jupiter's Darling (1955), Moonfleet (1955), The Scarlet Coat (1955), and The King's Thief (1955) (again as Charles II).

In 1955, he was announced as hosting and occasionally appearing in The Ringmaster, a TV series about the circus.

Sanders played the lead in Death of a Scoundrel (1956) and the TV series The George Sanders Mystery Theater (1957).

He worked one last time with Power on Solomon and Sheba (1959); Power died during filming and was replaced by Yul Brynner.

In 1961, he appeared in The Rebel with Tony Hancock before being top-billed in Cairo (1963), then appeared in The Cracksman (1963), Dark Purpose (1964), and The Golden Head (1964). Peter Sellers and Sanders appeared together in  The Pink Panther sequel A Shot in the Dark (1964). Sanders had earlier inspired Sellers's character Hercules Grytpype-Thynne in the BBC radio comedy series The Goon Show (1951–60).

Sanders declared bankruptcy in 1966 due to some poor investments.

Sanders was cast in the musical comedy, Sherry!, but withdrew from the show while it was out-of-town.  He was replaced by Clive Revill for Broadway.

Final films
He had a supporting role in John Huston's The Kremlin Letter (1969), in which his first scene showed him dressed in drag and playing the piano in a gay bar in San Francisco. In 1969, he announced he was leaving show business.

Novels
Two ghostwritten crime novels were published under his name to cash in on his fame at the height of his wartime film series.  The first was Crime on My Hands (1944), written in the first person, and mentioning his Saint and Falcon films.

Singing

During the production of The Jungle Book, Sanders was unavailable to provide the singing voice for his character Shere Khan during the final recording of the song, "That's What Friends Are For". According to Richard Sherman, Bill Lee, a member of The Mellomen, was called in to substitute for Sanders.

Personal life
On 27 October 1940, Sanders married Susan Larson (born Elsie Poole). The couple divorced in 1949. From later that year until 1954, Sanders was married to Zsa Zsa Gabor, with whom he starred in the film Death of a Scoundrel (1956). On 10 February 1959, Sanders married Benita Hume, widow of Ronald Colman. She died of bone cancer in 1967, aged 60, the same year that Sanders's brother Tom Conway died of liver failure. Sanders had become distant from his brother because of Conway's drinking problem.

Sanders' autobiography Memoirs of a Professional Cad was published in 1960 and gained critical praise for its wit. Sanders suggested the title A Dreadful Man for his biography, later written by his friend Brian Aherne and published in 1979. Sanders's fourth and last marriage on 4 December 1970 was to Magda Gabor, the elder sister of his second wife. This marriage lasted only 32 days, after which he began drinking heavily.

Final years and death

Even before his dementia, Sanders had grown increasingly reclusive and depressed due to a string of tragedies including the deaths of his third wife, his mother and his brother Tom in the space of a year. This was followed by a failed investment, which cost him millions. Before his dementia diagnosis, he got a quick divorce from his fourth wife. According to Aherne's biography, he also had a minor stroke. Sanders could not bear the prospect of losing his health or needing help to carry out everyday tasks, and became deeply depressed. About this time, he found that he could no longer play his grand piano, so he dragged it outside and smashed it with an axe. His last girlfriend, Lorraine Chanel, with whom he had an on-off relationship in the last four years of his life, persuaded him to sell his beloved house in Majorca, Spain, which he later bitterly regretted. From then on, he drifted.

On 23 April 1972, Sanders checked into a hotel in Castelldefels, a coastal town near Barcelona, where he phoned his friend George Mikell. Two days after swallowing the contents of five bottles of the barbiturate Nembutal, he died from cardiac arrest.  He left behind two suicide notes, one of which read:

David Niven wrote in Bring on the Empty Horses (1975), the second volume of his memoirs, that in 1937, his friend George Sanders had predicted that he would commit suicide from a barbiturate overdose when he was 65, and that in his 50s, he had appeared to be depressed because his marriages had failed and several tragedies had befallen him.

Sanders has two stars on the Hollywood Walk of Fame, for films at 1636 Vine Street and television at 7007 Hollywood Boulevard.

Complete filmography

 Love, Life and Laughter (1934) as Singer in Public Bar (uncredited)
 Things to Come (1936) as Pilot (uncredited)
 Strange Cargo (1936) as Roddy Burch
 Find the Lady (1936) as Curly Randall
 The Man Who Could Work Miracles (1936) as Indifference
 Dishonour Bright (1936) as Lisle
 Lloyd's of London (1936) as Lord Everett Stacy
 Love Is News (1937) as Count Andre de Guyon
 Slave Ship (1937) as Lefty
 The Lady Escapes (1937) as Rene Blanchard
 Lancer Spy (1937) as Baron Kurt von Rohback / Lt. Michael Bruce
 International Settlement (1938) as Del Forbes
 Four Men and a Prayer (1938) as Wyatt Leigh
 Mr. Moto's Last Warning (1939) as Eric Norvel
 The Outsider (1939) as Anton Ragatzy
 So This Is London (1939) as Dr. de Reseke
 The Saint Strikes Back (1939) as Simon Templar / The Saint
 Confessions of a Nazi Spy (1939) as Schlager
 The Saint in London (1939) as Simon Templar / The Saint
 Nurse Edith Cavell (1939) as Capt. Heinrichs
 Allegheny Uprising (1939) as Capt. Swanson
 The Saint's Double Trouble (1940) as Simon Templar aka The Saint / 'Boss' Duke Bates
 Green Hell (1940) as Forrester
 The House of the Seven Gables (1940) as Jaffrey Pyncheon
 Rebecca (1940) as Jack Favell
 The Saint Takes Over (1940) as Simon Templar / The Saint
 Foreign Correspondent (1940) as Scott ffolliott
 Bitter Sweet (1940) as Baron von Tranisch
 The Son of Monte Cristo (1940) as Gen. Gurko Lanen
 The Saint in Palm Springs (1941) as Simon Templar / The Saint
 Rage in Heaven (1941) as Ward Andrews
 Man Hunt (1941) as Major Quive-Smith
 Sundown (1941) as Coombes
 The Gay Falcon (1941) as Gay Laurence / The Falcon
 A Date with the Falcon (1942) as Gay Laurence / The Falcon
 Son of Fury: The Story of Benjamin Blake (1942) as Sir Arthur Blake
 The Falcon Takes Over (1942) as Gay Lawrence / The Falcon
 Her Cardboard Lover (1942) as Tony Barling
 Tales of Manhattan (1942) as Williams
 The Falcon's Brother (1942) as Gay Lawrence / The Falcon
 The Moon and Sixpence (1942) as Charles Strickland
 The Black Swan (1942) as Capt. Billy Leech
 Quiet Please, Murder (1942) as Jim Fleg
 This Land Is Mine (1943) as George Lambert
 They Came to Blow Up America (1943) as Carl Steelman / Ernst Reiter
 Appointment in Berlin (1943) as Wing Cmdr. Keith Wilson
 Paris After Dark (1943) as Dr. Andre Marbel
 The Lodger (1944) as Inspector John Warwick
 Action in Arabia (1944) as Michael Gordon
 Summer Storm (1944) as Fedor Mikhailovich Petroff
 Hangover Square (1945) as Dr. Allan Middleton
 The Picture of Dorian Gray (1945) as Lord Henry Wotton
 The Strange Affair of Uncle Harry (1945) as Harry Melville Quincey
 A Scandal in Paris (1946) as Eugène François Vidocq
 The Strange Woman (1946) as John Evered
 The Private Affairs of Bel Ami (1947) as Georges Duroy
 The Ghost and Mrs. Muir (1947) as Miles Fairley
 Lured (1947) as Robert Fleming
 Forever Amber (1947) as King Charles II
 The Fan (1949) as Lord Robert Darlington
 Samson and Delilah (1949) as The Saran of Gaza
 All About Eve (1950) as Addison DeWitt
 Black Jack (1950) as Mike Alexander
 I Can Get It for You Wholesale (1951) as J.F. Noble
 The Light Touch (1951) as Felix Guignol
 Ivanhoe  (1952) as De Bois-Guilbert
 Assignment – Paris! (1952) as Nicholas Strang
 Call Me Madam (1953) as General Cosmo Constantine
 Witness to Murder (1954) as Albert Richter
 King Richard and the Crusaders (1954) as King Richard I
 Journey to Italy (Viaggio in Italia) (1954) as Alexander 'Alex' Joyce
 Jupiter's Darling (1955) as Fabius Maximus
 Moonfleet (1955) as Lord Ashwood
 The Scarlet Coat (1955) as Dr. Jonathan Odell
 The King's Thief (1955) as Charles II
 Never Say Goodbye (1956) as Victor
 While the City Sleeps (1956) as Mark Loving
 That Certain Feeling (1956) as Larry Larkin
 Death of a Scoundrel (1956) as Clementi Sabourin
 The Seventh Sin (1957) as Tim Waddington
 Rock-A-Bye Baby (1958) as Danny Poole (1959) (scenes cut)
 The Whole Truth (1958) as Carliss
 From the Earth to the Moon (1958) as Stuyvesant Nicholl
 That Kind of Woman (1959) as A.L.
 Solomon and Sheba (1959) as Adonijah
 A Touch of Larceny (1960) as Sir Charles Holland
 The Last Voyage (1960) as Captain Robert Adams
 Bluebeard's Ten Honeymoons (1960) as Henri Landru
 Cone of Silence (1960) as Sir Arnold Hobbes
 Village of the Damned (1960) as Gordon Zellaby
 The Rebel (aka, Call Me Genius, 1961) as Sir Charles Brewer
 Five Golden Hours (1961) as Mr. Bing
 Le Rendez-vous (1961) as J.K. / Kellermann
 Operation Snatch (1962) as Maj. Hobson
 In Search of the Castaways (1962) as Thomas Ayerton
 Cairo (1963) as The Major
 The Cracksman (1963) as Guv'nor
 Dark Purpose (1964) as Raymond Fontaine
 The Golden Head (1964) as Basil Palmer
 A Shot in the Dark (1964) as Benjamin Ballon
 Last Plane to Baalbeck (1965) as Prince Makowski
 The Golden Head (1965) as Basil Palmer
 The Amorous Adventures of Moll Flanders (1965) as The Banker
 Trunk to Cairo (1965) as Professor Schlieben
 The Quiller Memorandum (1966) as Gibbs
 Witchdoctor in Tails as the narrator (1966)
 Warning Shot (1967) as Calvin York
 Good Times (1967) as Mordicus / Knife McBlade / White hunter / Zarubian
 The Jungle Book (1967) as Shere Khan, the Tiger (voice)
 Laura (1968 TV movie) as Waldo Lydecker
 King of Africa (1968) as Captain Walter Phillips
 The Candy Man (1969) as Sidney Carter
 The Girl from Rio (1969) as Masius
 The Body Stealers (1969) as General Armstrong
 The Best House in London (1969) as Sir Francis Leybourne
 The Kremlin Letter (1970) as Warlock
 Rendezvous with Dishonour (1970) as General Downes
 Doomwatch (1972) as The Admiral – Sir Geoffrey
 Endless Night (1972) as Andrew Lippincott
 Psychomania (1973) as Shadwell (final film role)

Television
 Screen Directors Playhouse (1956) as Charles Ferris / Baron
 Ford Star Jubilee "You're the Top" (1956) 
 The George Sanders Mystery Theater (1957)
 What's My Line? 15 September 1957 (Episode No. 380) (season 9, episode 3) Mystery Guest
 The Rogues (1965) as Leonard Carvel
 Voyage to the Bottom of the Sea "The Traitor" (1965) as Fenton
 The Man From U.N.C.L.E. "The Gazebo in the Maze Affair" and "The Yukon Affair" (1965) as G. Emory Partridge
 Daniel Boone (1966) as Col. Roger Barr
 Batman (1966) as Mr. Freeze
 Mission: Impossible - The Merchant (1971) as Armand Anderssarian

Broadway
 Conversation Piece, at the 44th Street Theatre, 1934

References

Bibliography

 Aherne, Brian. A Dreadful Man: The Story of Hollywood's Most Original Cad, George Sanders. New York: Simon & Schuster, 1979. .
 McNally, Peter. Bette Davis: The Performances that made her Great. Jefferson North Carolina: McFarland, 2008. .
 Niven, David. The Moon's A Balloon. London: Dell Publishing, 1983. .
 Sanders, George. Memoirs of a Professional Cad: The Autobiography of George Sanders. London: G.P. Putnam's Sons, 1960. .
 VanDerBeets, Richard. George Sanders: An Exhausted Life''. Toronto, Ontario, Canada: Madison Books, 1990. .

Further reading

External links

 
 
 
 
 
 

|-
!colspan="3" style="background:#C1D8FF;"| Husband of a Gabor Sister

!colspan="3" style="background:#C1D8FF;"| Acting roles
|-

1906 births
1972 suicides
20th Century Studios contract players
20th-century English male actors
20th-century English male singers
20th-century English singers
20th-century English male writers
20th-century English non-fiction writers
alumni of the University of Manchester Institute of Science and Technology
barbiturates-related deaths
Best Supporting Actor Academy Award winners
British expatriate male actors in the United States
drug-related suicides in Spain
emigrants from the Russian Empire to the United Kingdom
English autobiographers
English male film actors
English male non-fiction writers
English male television actors
English male voice actors
English people of Estonian descent
English people of German descent
English people of Scottish descent
male actors from Saint Petersburg
Metro-Goldwyn-Mayer contract players
people educated at Bedales School
people educated at Brighton College
people from Brighton
RKO Pictures contract players
singers from Saint Petersburg
writers from Saint Petersburg